Wish I'd Kept A Scrapbook: A Tribute to Tullycraft is a 2010 tribute album to the pioneering indiepop / twee band Tullycraft. The album, released on Unchikun Records, features cover versions of songs written by Tullycraft, performed by a number of artists including: Math and Physics Club, the Smittens, Bunnygrunt, Hot Lava, Darren Hanlon & Rose Melberg. The album was compiled by Lee Grutman from the band LA Tool & Die and was a labor of love for all of the bands involved.

Track listing

See also
Tullycraft

External links
Unchikun Records
Tullycraft
Eardrums
Tweendie
Three Imaginary Girls
Fensepost
Powerpopulist
A Layer of Chips

Tribute albums
2010 compilation albums